Katarzyna Rogowiec (born 14 October 1977) is a Polish Paralympian. She won two gold medals at the 2006 Winter Paralympics in Turin in cross-country skiing, and also competes at the highest levels in biathlon (current world champion).

Rogowiec hails from the Polish mountain folk. She was born in Rabka-Zdrój, Poland. She is an economist by training, and lives in Kraków, while training in Nowy Sącz.

She won three silver medals at the 2003 World Championships, and was the world champion in biathlon in the 12.5 km Individual at the 2005 World Championships.

When she was three years old, she suffered a debilitating accident at harvest, when a harvesting machine cut off both of her hands. She says that she does not remember any of that, except for hearing it through her parents' tales. She grew up and learned to eat and drink without the use of hands.

In 2010, she established the Katarzyna Rogowiec Foundation avanti.

Katarzyna will not be appearing at the 2014 Winter Paralympics in Sochi.

Education
College of People Management in Warsaw, People Management: post-graduate studies
Cracow University of Economics, Finance and Banking: Public Finance
II High School in Rabka - Zdroj

Sport achievements

Paralympic Olympics

2002  Winter Paralympic Games in Salt-Lake City
4th place in cross-country skiing on 5 km: classic technique

2006  Winter Paralympic Games in Turin
1st place in cross-country skiing (5 km): free style
1st place in cross-country skiing (15 km): classic technique
4th place in cross-country skiing (10 km): classic technique
4th and 6th place in biathlon (7.5 km and 12.5 km)
6th place in women's relay

2010  Winter Paralympic Games in Vancouver
3rd place in cross-country skiing (15 km): free style
4th place in biathlon (12.5 km)
5th place in biathlon pursuit
6th place in women's relay

World Championships

2003  World Championships in Baiersbronn, Germany
3rd place in cross-country skiing (10 km): classic technique
3rd place in cross-country skiing (15 km) free style
3rd place in women's relay

2005  World Championships in Fort Kent, United States
1st place in biathlon (12.5 km)
2nd place in biathlon (7.5 km)
3rd place in cross-country skiing (5 km): classic technique
3rd place in cross-country skiing (10 km): free style

2009  World Championships in Vuocatti, Finland
4th place in cross - country skiing (5 km): free style
7th place in sprint: classic technique

2011  World Championships in Khanty Mansiysk, Russia
1st place in cross-country skiing (5 km): free style
2nd place in sprint
2rd place in biathlon sprint
2nd place in biathlon (7.5 km)
2nd place in biathlon (12.5 km)
3rd place in cross-country skiing (15 km): classic style

World Cup
2005/2006 - cross-country skiing: 3rd place
2006/2007 - cross-country skiing: 2nd place
2007/2008 - cross-country skiing: 7th place, biathlon: 6th place
2008/2009 - cross-country skiing: 7th place, biathlon: 3rd place
2009/2010 - cross-country skiing: 4th place, biathlon: 7th place
2010/2011 - cross-country skiing: 4th place, biathlon: 4th place
2011/2012 - cross-country skiing: 1st place (Crystal Ball), biathlon: 2nd place

Other sports experiences
Member of The IPC Athletes Council (since 2006)
Member of The World Anti-Doping Agency Athletes Council (since 2009)
Independent Observer - Commonwealth Games Delhi 2010 Mission
2000-2007 - participation in several athletics competitions
2008 - gained the summit of Kilimanjaro
participation in several marathons

Awards and honors
The Order of Polonia Restituta
Gold badge "FOR MERIT FOR SPORT"
The Jubilee Medal  "80 Years of Cracow University
Winner of 73. Poll Sport Champions in Disabled Athlete category
Several Awards from Marshal of the Malopolska voivodship
Best Disabled Athlete in 2006, 2010, 2011

References

External links
 Official webpage

1977 births
Living people
Polish amputees
Polish female biathletes
Polish female cross-country skiers
Knights of the Order of Polonia Restituta
Paralympic biathletes of Poland
Paralympic cross-country skiers of Poland
Cross-country skiers at the 2002 Winter Paralympics
Cross-country skiers at the 2006 Winter Paralympics
Cross-country skiers at the 2010 Winter Paralympics
Biathletes at the 2006 Winter Paralympics
Biathletes at the 2010 Winter Paralympics
Paralympic gold medalists for Poland
Paralympic bronze medalists for Poland
People from Rabka-Zdrój
Sportspeople from Lesser Poland Voivodeship
Medalists at the 2006 Winter Paralympics
Medalists at the 2010 Winter Paralympics
Paralympic medalists in cross-country skiing